This article details the qualifying phase for sailing at the 2024 Summer Olympics.  312 quota places for the Games are entitled to the sailors coming from their respective NOCs, based on the results at designated regattas supervised by World Sailing. Host nation France reserves a single boat in each of the ten sailing classes, whereas four quota places (two per gender) are distributed to the NOCs competing in the men's Laser and women's Laser Radial under the Tripartite Commission.

The qualification period commences at the 2023 Sailing World Championships in The Hague, Netherlands, where 107 places, about forty percent of the total quota, will be awarded to the highest-ranked NOCs across ten different sailing classes. Fourteen places will be distributed to the sailors competing in the men's (Laser) and women's dinghy (Laser Radial) at the 2024 ILCA World Championships, while the highest-ranked NOCs vying for qualification will receive a single quota place in each boat, except for Laser and Laser Radial (three per gender for Asia and two for the rest) at their respective continental regattas (Africa, Asia, Central & South America, Europe, North America & Caribbean, and Oceania).

The remainder of the total quota will be attributed to the eligible sailors through the 2024 Last Chance Regatta in Hyères, France (39 boats in total) and as part of the World Sailing Emerging Nations Program (two boats per gender each in windsurfing and dinghy).

Timeline

Quota places
Below are the number of boats. 470, 49er, 49erFX, and Nacra 17 classes consist of two crew members in each boat.

Qualification summary

Men's events

Men's windsurfer – IQFoil

Men's kite – Formula Kite

Men's one-person dinghy – Laser

Men's skiff – 49er

Women's events

Women's windsurfer – IQFoil

Women's kite – Formula Kite

Women's one-person dinghy – Laser Radial

Women's skiff – 49erFX

Mixed events

Mixed two-person dinghy – 470

Mixed multihull – Nacra 17

References

Qualification for the 2024 Summer Olympics
Sailing at the 2024 Summer Olympics
2024